Srivastava, also spelled variously as Shrivastava, Shrivastav or Srivastav, is a common surname found amongst the Chitraguptavanshi Kayastha community of upper caste Hindus particularly in the Hindi-speaking regions of India.

Origin
Srivastavas are one of the twelve sub-clans of the Chitraguptvanshi Kayasthas that were traditionally involved in record-keeping, administration and military services.

They regard themselves as a de facto varna that arose to keep records of the four varnas that came before them. Traditions and occupations associated with them, and their belief in the mythical roles assigned to Chitragupta, their progenitor, partly support this claim.

Most of the recorded history, after the 10th century AD, of this clan is centred around Varanasi and present day eastern Uttar Pradesh and central India, as being influential during Ancient empires and Mughal empire in the Indian subcontinent, earning such titles as Pandit, Thakur and Lala.

Etymology 
The title Śrīvāstava is the shortened form of Śrīvāstavya and thus derived directly from the Sanskrit root words Sri (श्री) "God" and  vas (वस्) "to dwell" by adding the primary suffix tavyat which denotes an agent and causes the lengthening of the radical vowel. While the word Sri is used in Sanskrit as honorific prefix to the names of deities  and vāstavya means "a resident, inhabitant"; thereby the whole meaning "in whom God dwells".  Note, however, that a word's meaning is derived from its use in sentence, not from its etymology.

According to another explanation, the name "Srivastava" originates from "Srivastu/Suvastu", the former name of the Swat River, which is said to be the place of origin of this clan.

Notable people with this name

Notable people named Srivastava (or its variations) include:
 Aadesh Shrivastava (1966–2015), Indian music director
 Kapil Srivastava, Indian guitarist, music composer, educationist & author
 Aanjjan Srivastav (born 1948), Indian film, television and stage dancer/actor
 Aditya Shrivastava (born 1968), Indian actor
 Ajita Srivastava, Indian singer
 Alankrita Shrivastava (born 1979), Indian filmmaker 
 Anand & Milind Shrivastav, Indian music directors
 Ashirbadi Lal Srivastava (1899–1973), Indian historian
 Chandrika Prasad Srivastava (1920–2013), Indian diplomat
 Chitragupta Shrivastava, Indian music director
 Dheer Charan Srivastav (born 1967), Indian actor
 Ganesh Prasad Srivastava (1933–2011), physicist, author
 Hari Shankar Srivastava (1921-2017), Indian historian
 Harish Chandra Srivastava, Indian politician
 J. N. Srivastava (1933–2010), Indian mathematician
 Maharishi Mahesh Yogi (1918–2008, recorded by Allahabad University as "M.C. Shrivastava"), introduced Transcendental Meditation
 Mansi Srivastava (born 1990), Indian TV actress
 Nikhil Srivastava, Indian mathematician 
 Nirmala Srivastava (1923–2011), founder of Sahaja Yoga
 Onkar Nath Srivastava (born 1942), Indian physicist 
 Dr. Rajendra Prasad (3 December 1884 – 28 February 1963) was the first President of India, in office from 1950 to 1962. 
 Rajendra Srivastava (born 1951), Indian academic
 Raju Srivastav (born 1963), Indian comedian
Ramesh Srivastava (born 1983), American singer
 Sanjeev Srivastava, Indian journalist
 Shailendra Nath Shrivastava (1936–2006), Indian politician
 Tara Rani Srivastava, Indian woman freedom fighter

 Notable Srivastavas who changed their name
 Amitabh Bachchan (born 1942), born as Amitabh Srivastava, Bollywood actor
 Harivansh Rai Bachchan (1907–2003), born as Harivansh Rai Srivastava, Indian poet 
 Madan Mohan Malaviya (1861-1964), founder of Banaras Hindu University
 Lal Bahadur Shastri (1904–1966), second Prime Minister of India, son of Sharada Prasad Srivastava
 Zamindaar Babu Trilok Nath (1866–1960, born Trilok Nath Shrivastav), prince of British India
 Parichay Das, writer and editor, born Ravindra Nath Srivastava
 Natwarlal (1912–2009), born Mithilesh Kumar Srivastava, Indian con man
 Jayaprakash Narayan (1902–1979, son of Harsu Dayal Srivastava), Indian independence activist, social reformer and political leader
 Munshi Premchand (1880–1936, born Dhanpat Rai Srivastava), Indian writer

References

Indian surnames
Kayastha
People from Swat District